The Meru (Wameru in Swahili), also known as the Va-Rwa (Rwa being the root word), are a Bantu ethnic group native to the slopes of Mount Meru in Arusha Region.  The Meru people share the same name with the Meru people of Kenya, but they are completely different ethnic groups each with their own unique history and identity.

The Meru people are said to have arrived to the slopes of the great mountain around 800 years ago coming from the Usambara Mountains in Tanga Region. According to the inhabitants, migration occurred back and forth throughout the region, and the Meru people should be viewed as a part of the bigger population inhabiting the entire Kilimanjaro Corridor. Upon arriving at the southeastern slopes of Mount Meru they were met by the hunter-gatherer group called the Koningo whom they absorbed into Meru society. The waMeru are known for their intensive agricultural practises.

Today many descendants of Meru people still live in their homeland and Mount Meru and Arumeru District are named in their honor. Upepo wa kisulisuli is named after UMALEE in meru language.

References

Ethnic groups in Tanzania
Indigenous peoples of East Africa
Indigenous peoples of Arusha Region